The Louis D. Brandeis Center for Human Rights Under Law (LDB) is a nonprofit organization founded by Kenneth L. Marcus in 2012 to advance the civil and human rights of the Jewish people and promote justice for all. LDB is active on American campuses, where it, according to the organization, combats anti-Semitism and anti-Zionism.

LDB was named after Louis D. Brandeis, a Jewish American lawyer and associate justice on the Supreme Court of the United States active in the Zionist movement. LDB has no relation to Brandeis University or to Louis D. Brandeis himself.

Leadership and organization 
LDB was founded in early 2012 by Kenneth L. Marcus, a former Staff Director of the U.S. Commission on Civil Rights who served as the Assistant Secretary of Education for Civil Rights from June 2018 to July 2020. Marcus is the author of The Definition of Antisemitism (Oxford University Press, 2015).

The Board of Directors are Richard Cravatts, Tevi Troy, L. Rachel Lerman, and Adam S. Feuerstein.

LDB Law student chapters 
In 2013, LDB established law student chapters at several law schools in the US. The purpose of these chapters is to foster "a new generation of leaders who share LDB's mission" which includes combating anti-Semitism and anti-Israelism and the Boycotts, Divestment, and Sanctions (BDS) movement in particular. BDS is a pro-Palestinian organization that calls for comprehensive international boycotts of Israel similar to those that was imposed on South Africa. Since its founding in 2005, BDS has been active on American campuses and found some success there. According to LDB lawyer Danit Sibovits, the chapters seek to "engage law students in civil rights work and engage them in public advocacy" and provide "an opportunity for law students to gain practical legal experience while they are still in school." Speakers may address topics such as Jewish civil rights advocacy, campus anti-Semitism, international human rights law, Israel legal advocacy, counter-terrorism legal policy.

LDB law students investigate anti-Semitic incidents, provide pro-bono legal research and advocacy services to victims of discrimination, file legal complaints, and work with university administrators or policies to protect Jewish students.

The current list of law student chapters is: Benjamin N. Cardozo School of Law, New York City; Case Western Reserve University School of Law, Cleveland, Ohio; Chicago Kent College of Law, Chicago, Illinois; City University of New York School of Law, Queens, New York; Cornell University School of Law, Ithaca, New York; DePaul University College of Law, Chicago, Illinois; Emory University School of Law, Atlanta, Georgia; Harvard University Law School, Cambridge, Massachusetts; Loyola University of Chicago School of Law, Chicago, Illinois; Northeastern University School of Law, Boston, Massachusetts; University of California – Berkeley School of Law, Berkeley, California; University of California – Los Angeles (UCLA) School of Law, Los Angeles, California; University of Chicago School of Law, Chicago, Illinois; University of Minnesota Law School, Minneapolis, Minnesota; University of Pennsylvania School of Law, Philadelphia, Pennsylvania; University of St. Thomas School of Law, Minneapolis, Minnesota; University of Virginia School of Law, Charlottesville, Virginia; University of Washington School of Law, Seattle, Washington.

JIGSAW Fellows 
The Jigsaw Initiative is a program run by LDB that trains a specialized group of law students in using legal tools and skills to combat anti-Semitism and BDS on college campuses. JIGSAW stands for Justice Initiative Guiding Student Activists Worldwide and the JIGSAW Fellows are taught to fight against anti-Semitic incidents on campus by utilizing university policies, and federal and state law. They are trained to act as mentors to undergraduate students in helping them confront anti-Semitism and BDS on campus.

Anti-Semitism 

LDB definition of anti-Semitism follows that of the European Monitoring Centre (EUMC) Working Definition of Antisemitism: "Antisemitism is a certain perception of Jews, which may be expressed as hatred toward Jews. Rhetorical and physical manifestations of antisemitism are directed toward Jewish or non-Jewish individuals and/or their property, toward Jewish community institutions and religious facilities."

In March 2013, LDB launched a Campus Anti-Semitism Legal Advocacy Initiative. Specifically, LDB works with faculty and students to investigate incidents, works with administration on procedures and protocols and files legal complaints when necessary and appropriate.

LDB considers adopting a definition of anti-Semitism to be crucial for universities and government to make clear the boundaries between hateful actions and legitimate behavior. The US State Department provides a definition of anti-Semitism, but it only is applied for international monitoring. LDB is working with universities and domestic government bodies to adopt a definition of anti-Semitism. In March 2016, the University of California Board of Regents adopted a Statement of Principles Against Intolerance, which included a contextual statement declaring that, "Anti-Semitism and anti-Semitic forms of anti-Zionism are forms of discrimination and will not be tolerated at the University of California." LDB had previously issued a letter to the Board of Regents, highlighting incidents at UCLA, Santa Barbara, Davis, Berkeley, and Irvine.

Anti-Israelism

The Boycott, Sanctions, Divestment (BDS) movement against Israel has gained significant momentum in recent years, particularly on college campuses. Opponents to BDS, such as the Anti-Defamation League, has alleged that BDS is anti-Semitic. It is in the Brandeis Center's view that the BDS campaign is anti-Semitic because some of its proponents act out of conscious hostility to the Jewish people; others act from unconscious or tacit disdain for Jews; and still others operate out of a climate of opinion that contains elements that are hostile to Jews  and serve as the conduits through whom anti-Jewish tropes and memes are communicated; while all of them work to sustain a movement that attacks the commitment to Israel that is central to the identity of the overwhelming majority of Jewish people. With the rise of the BDS movement, the Brandeis Center has increasingly sought to deal with the anti-Semitism associated with the movement.

LDB has been involved in numerous lawsuits involving the Israeli–Palestinian conflict and campus life. Its critics claims that the organization engages in lawfare on Israel's behalf—lawsuits and threats of lawsuits intended to silence criticism of Israel.

Anti-Semitism Awareness Act 
LDB is a strong supporter of the Anti-Semitism Awareness Act, a controversial piece of legislation introduced to the US Congress in 2016 which requires the Department of Education to use a specific definition of anti-Semitism when "reviewing, investigating, or deciding whether there has been a violation of title VI of the Civil Rights Act of 1964."

Advocacy activities 
Since its founding, LDB has advocated against anti-Semitism and the BDS movement.

Brooklyn College ejection of students (2013–2014) 

On February 7, 2013, four pro-Israel Jewish students at Brooklyn College were evicted from an open forum organized by Students for Justice in Palestine. The students alleged that their First Amendment rights had been violated and that they had been targeted because they were Jewish. Three of the four students were represented by LDB as they field a legal complaint against the college. The complaint eventually led to Brooklyn College President Karen L. Gould apologizing to the evicted students.

Criticism of Middle East studies (2014) 
In 2014, LDB produced a report called The Morass of Middle East Studies which accused federally-funded Middle East studies centers at various colleges to be biased against Israel. LDB claimed that the federal funds provided to 129 international studies and foreign language centers at universities by Title VI of the Higher Education Act of 1965 were therefore being misused.

The report was accompanied by a statement signed by 10 pro-Israel groups, expressing concern over alleged misuse of taxpayer money and arguing that the programs "disseminate anti-American and anti-Israel falsehoods." The statement also called for changes to Title VI which should "[r]equire recipients of Title VI funds to establish grievance procedures to address complaints that programs are not reflecting diverse perspectives and a wide range of views" and "[r]equire the U.S. Department of Education to establish a formal complaint-resolution process similar to that in use to enforce Title VI of the Civil Rights Act of 1964." The statement referenced a study by the AMCHA Initiative which, among other things, claimed that 93% of the mentions of Israel in any event sponsored, or co-sponsored by the UCLA's Middle East studies center, in the period fall 2010 to spring 2013 were critical.

Amy W. Newhall, executive director of the Middle East Studies Association (MESA), rejected the groups' statement as "politically motivated attacks on scholars and academic institutions" and as a serious threat to free speech. She also stated that MESA opposes anti-Semitism and that

UCLA's media relations office stated that the university "remains dedicated to complying with all federal laws and respecting the free and open exchange of ideas representing diverse viewpoints." It also claimed that the centers on UCLA regularly provide programming on Israel.

In response to the criticism from Newhall, Marcus in a letter to the editor of The Chronicle insisted that the groups' goal was not to shut down open discussion, rather the opposite: "accountability systems to ensure that these programs offer the diversity of perspectives that existing law requires. If Professor Newhall's association defends the status quo against diverse perspectives, then it is they who are trying to shut down debate."

Harvard SodaStream controversy (2014) 
In April 2014, students at Harvard University raised concerns about the water machines in the dining rooms which had SodaStream labels on them. The company producing the machines had been taken over by SodaStream which maintained a factory in the Israeli-occupied West Bank. A meeting was held with the students and Harvard University Dining Services (HUDS) on April 7, after which HUDS decided to stop buying more machines and to remove the labels on the ones they had. When the decision was reported on in the student newspaper The Harvard Crimson in December, Harvard's President Drew G. Faust said he was not aware of it and requested an investigation. Pro-Israel and Jewish advocacy groups criticized the decision to stop buying from SodaStream, particularly LDB. In a comment, Marcus strongly criticized the decision:

Anti-Semitism Report (2014–2015) 
In February 2015, LDB and Trinity College issued an "Anti-Semitism Report," presenting results from an online survey of American Jewish college students. The survey had a 10–12% response rate, does not claim to be representative, and included 1,157 self-identified Jewish students at 55 campuses nationwide. The report showed that 54% of the students who took part in the online survey reported having experienced or witnessed anti-Semitism on their campuses during the Spring semester of the last academic year.

Marcus claimed that the findings should have been a wake-up call to college administrators that Jewish students face real problems of bias.

The study was criticized by The Forward which argued that the study documented only a snapshot in time, rather than a trend, because it did not have a representative sample of Jewish college students and because it allowed students to define anti-Semitism (leaving the term open to impression).

Anti-Muslim Discrimination (2015) 
In November 2015, a Muslim student at San Diego State University reported that a man pushed her in a parking garage and grabbed her by her headscarf and told her to "Get out of this country," that she was a terrorist, and that "You people bombed Paris." Following the incident, LDB sent a letter to San Diego State University President Elliot Hirshman and Chief Diversity Officer Aaron I. Bruce, expressing concern over the incident, and urging SDSU to take immediate action in response.

The Milan Chatterjee affair (2015–2016) 

The Milan Chatterjee affair was a controversy on University of California, Los Angeles (UCLA) over the President of the Graduate Student Association (GSA), Milan Chatterjee's allocation of funds. In October 2015, Chatterjee claimed that the GSA had a policy requiring "neutrality" on speech relating to "Israel-Palestine" and that groups advocating for boycotts of Israel, such as Students for Justice in Palestine (SJP), would be ineligible for funding. SJP felt unfairly singled out as they advocate for boycotts of Israel. Civil rights groups got involved in the matter on behalf of SJP and Zionist groups on behalf of Chatterjee. The university launched an investigation which found Chatterjee guilty of having violated university policy that requires neutral point of view in allocating funds.

Early on, LDB law students sided with Chatterjee and questioned how the UCLA was addressing the situation. Marcus condemned BDS-activists who tried to have Chatterjee removed from office: "the Milan Chatterjee affair reflects the insidiousness of the anti-Israel movement's new strategy, which is to suppress pro-Israel advocacy and intimidate not only Jewish pro-Israel students but anyone who even remains neutral."

Modern Language Association proposed boycott (2015–2016) 

LDB was active in lobbying against the Modern Language Association's proposed academic boycott of Israel. In particular, in 2016, it threatened to sue the organization if a resolution under consideration endorsing such a boycott was passed. The resolution, however, failed with the vote 113–79.

Film screening protest (2016) 

In May 2016, pro-Israeli groups at UC Irvine (UCI) hosted a screening of the film Beneath the Helmet and intended to hold a panel discussion with Israeli soldiers. A group of up to 50 pro-Palestinian students protested the event. Following the event, the protestors were accused of improper conduct and some participants in the film screening said they had been harassed. LDB and other pro-Israel groups acted on behalf of the allegedly harassed students and demanded that UCI investigated the matter. UCI did so, but their investigation cleared the protestors of most of the allegations, except of being too loud.

The campus group that had organized the protest, Students for Justice in Palestine (SJP), was issued a written warning and required to host an educational program, a punishment LDB thought were too lenient. In particular, one student, Eliana Kopley, claimed to have been chased by protestors and LDB were unhappy with UCI not having investigated that allegation.

American Studies Association lawsuit (2016–2019) 

In December 2013, the American Studies Association (ASA) voted to join the academic boycott of Israeli educational institutions. In April 2016, LDB, Eugene Kontorovich and four American studies professors sued ASA, alleging that the boycott was illegal. The lawsuit was dismissed in 2019 when the judge ruled that the plaintiffs lacked standing.

South Carolina Anti-Semitism Awareness Act (2017) 
In 2017, LDB endorsed the South Carolinian anti-BDS law H 3643 which would have required colleges to use the 2010 US State Department's definition of anti-Semitism when investigating alleged civil rights violations. Critics of the bill claimed that it was intended to suppress political speech by smearing it as anti-Semitism. Marcus, however, rejected that claim and stated that the bill did not restrict free speech. While the bill didn't pass the South Carolina legislature, in 2018, text mirroring the language of the bill was inserted into the 2018–2019 state budget bill which did pass.

Stoughton High School swastika (2017–2018) 
On November 22, 2016, a student at Stoughton High School, Massachusetts, created a swastika out of tape on a piece of paper and put it on a recycling bin in the school hallway. A Jewish girl noticed the swastika and asked him to remove it. He did so, and responded, "Well just burn it like they did to the Jews."

One teacher addressed the incident in her classroom and another spoke to a student about it. A third, Hilary Moll, having written a letter of recommendation on behalf of the student who created the swastika, contacted the college and withdrew her letter and explaining her reasons why. The information led the college to withdraw their acceptance of him. He was also suspended by the school for six days.

The school subsequently received a complaint from the mother of the student which stated that he felt that he was being bullied by members of faculty for his actions. The complaint mentioned one of the teachers, Jamie Regan, who had asked to have the student removed from her class on the Holocaust where Holocaust survivors would speak. Two of the teachers were reprimanded and Moll were suspended for 20 days without pay.

LDB lawyers stepped in on the teachers behalf which led to some exchanges between them and the school's superintendent Marguerite Rizzi who defended the decision to discipline the teachers. She cited privacy laws that protects confidential student records from disclosure as a reason as to why the school district couldn't reveal all the details of the case and that the lawyers therefore were only "seeking half a story" and using incorrect information. The LDB lawyers rebuffed that notion.

This led to a lengthy judicial process between LDB and the Stoughton High School. On May 18, 2018, arbitrators determined that the disciplinary action taken against Regan was wrong and that the letter of reprimand should be expunged from her personnel records. On July 19, arbitrators determined that Moll was wrongly suspended without pay, but that the letter of discipline against her should stand.

Anti-Semitic conduct at the University of Illinois-Urbana Champaign (2020–2021) 
In response to numerous allegations of anti-Semitic behavior at the University of Illinois-Urbana Champaign (UIUC), in March 2020, a complaint was filed with the Department of Education's Office for Civil Rights (OCR). This complaint, on behalf of the Jewish students at the university, was filed by the Louis D. Brandeis Center for Human Rights Under Law and Arnold & Porter Kaye Scholer LLP in collaboration with the Jewish United Fund and Hillel International, stating that the events taking place on campus are in violation of Title VI of the Civil Rights Act of 1964.

In November 2020, OCR then opened an investigation into the complaint. Following this action, UIUC along with LDB, Hillel International, and the Jewish United Fund put out a "joint statement" pledging to take a number of concrete steps to address anti-Semitism on its campus and support Jewish students.

Among these commitments, they promised to form an “Advisory Council on Jewish and Campus Life” and have just recently announced its establishment. Additionally, within the statement are provisions allowing students to publicly express their Jewish identity, identification with Israel and their belief in Zionism without fear of discrimination or intimidation. The university has pledged to safeguard these rights and more, to ensure the safety of its Jewish students and condemn anyone who threatens anti-Semitic harassment.

Stanford Title VII lawsuit (2021) 
The Brandeis Center filed a federal complaint on behalf of Jewish mental health counselors in 2021, alleging anti-Jewish harassment in Stanford University's Counseling & Psychological Services' (CAPS) Diversity, Equity & Inclusion (DEI) program. The complaint was filed with the U.S. Equal Employment Opportunity Commission and the California Department of Fair Employment and Housing. The Brandeis Center claimed that Stanford University's CAPS DEI program perpetuated a "hostile environment and invidious discrimination" that the program was designed to eliminate. The complaint alleged that the DEI committee declined requests to address anti-Semitism in their trainings, even in the aftermath of an anti-Semitic "Zoom-bombing." The lawsuit further asserted that DEI committee members at Stanford University's CAPS division invoked anti-Semitic stereotypes related to Jewish power and wealth.

Unilever Ben & Jerry’s lawsuit (2022) 
The Brandeis Center and co-counsel filed a lawsuit in the U.S. District Court of New Jersey on behalf of Avi Zinger, Ben & Jerry’s Israeli licensee, alleging that Unilever violated U.S. and Israeli law when they terminated a 34-year business relationship with Zinger to boycott Israel.

Unilever reached a settlement preventing Ben & Jerry's from boycotting Israel, which granted Avi Zinger the right to sell Ben & Jerry's ice cream in Israel and the West Bank under the company's Hebrew and Arabic names. The legal settlement was announced on June 29, 2022. The Brandeis Center commended the settlement as a "major defeat for the anti-Israel Boycott, Divestment, and Sanctions (BDS) movement."

Publications 

LDB authors have published numerous books, research articles, and opinion pieces that are relevant to LDB's mission.

Books:
 
 
 
 
 

Research : Testimony
 Federal Civil Rights Engagement with Arab and Muslim American Communities Post 9/11 
 Religious Harassment in Public Schools
 Fighting Anti-Semitism
 Ten Thousand Reasons to Protect Students from Religious Harassment and Bullying
 Fighting Sexual Harassment in American Higher Education

References

External links
 LDB's official Facebook page
 
 Publications : Brandeis Briefs

2012 establishments in Washington, D.C.
Human rights organizations based in the United States
Israel–United States relations
Lobbying organizations in the United States
Opposition to antisemitism in North America
Organizations established in 2012
Political advocacy groups in the United States
Zionism in the United States
Zionist organizations